Muloor is a census town in kaup taluk of Udupi District the Indian state of Karnataka.  Muloor name came From the word 'Mula' it means 'origin' it is the village of origin (Mula+ooru) of Sri Bobbarya Daiva (worshiping God or Daiva of Tulu Nadu).

Demographics 
 India census, Muloor had a population of 5057. Males constitute 46% of the population and females 54%. Muloor has an average literacy rate of 76%, higher than the national average of 59.5%: male literacy is 79%, and female literacy is 73%. In Muloor, 10% of the population is under 6 years of age.

Mulur(muloor) is a village situated in the Kaup district of Karnataka, India. It lies between the cities of Udupi and Mangalore, next to the National Highway 66. It is 15 km south of Udupi and 45 km north of Mangalore. neighbouring village for south Koppalangadi and north Uchila.
The main occupation of the people living here is Fishing and Farming. 
Famous and one of ancient place of mulur is  Sri Sarveshwara Bobbarya Kodamanithaya Daivastana and Bobbarya Pond (kola) other religious places like Sri Babbu swami daivasthana and Sri GuruBramha Muggerkala Daivasthana.

References 

Cities and towns in Udupi district